Alangan (also Romanized as Ālāngān) is a village in Alamut-e Pain Rural District, Rudbar-e Alamut District, Qazvin County, Qazvin Province, Iran. The 2006 census acknowledges its existence without report of population count.

References 

Populated places in Qazvin County